Alex "The Full-Moon" Moon (born 17 November 1971) born in Liverpool is an English professional feather/super feather/light/light welter/welter/light middleweight boxer of the 1990s and 2000s, who won the World Boxing Union (WBU) Intercontinental Featherweight Title, and Commonwealth super featherweight title, and was a challenger for the British Boxing Board of Control (BBBofC) British featherweight title against Jon Jo Irwin, and International Boxing Organization (IBO) super featherweight title against Affif Djelti, his professional fighting weight varied from , i.e. featherweight to , i.e. light middleweight.

References

External links

1971 births
English male boxers
Featherweight boxers
Light-middleweight boxers
Lightweight boxers
Light-welterweight boxers
Living people
Boxers from Liverpool
Super-featherweight boxers
Welterweight boxers